Sambhal is a census town in South West district in the Indian state of Delhi.

Demographics
 India census, Sambhal had a population of 11,064. Males constitute 61% of the population and females 39%. Sambhal has an average literacy rate of 60%, higher than the national average of 59.5%: male literacy is 68%, and female literacy is 47%. In Sambhal, 18% of the population is under 6 years of age.

References

At the time of partition a Muslim Khan Lodhi tribe been lived here and after partition they migrated to Pakistan. Hidayat Khan Lodhi's family also migrated to Pakistan. His grand children's has spread and living in Lahore, Kot Adu, Karachi, Multan etc.

Cities and towns in South West Delhi district